The 2020 Melbourne Boomers season is the 38th season for the franchise in the Women's National Basketball League (WNBL).

Due to the COVID-19 pandemic, a North Queensland hub is set to host the season. The season was originally 2020–21 and would be traditionally played over several months across the summer, however this seasons scheduling has been condensed. The six-week season will see Townsville, Cairns and Mackay host a 56-game regular season fixture, plus a four-game final series (2 x semi-finals, preliminary final and grand final). Each team will contest 14 games starting on 12 November, with the grand final scheduled for 20 December.

Roster

Standings

Results

Regular season

Finals

References

External links
Melbourne Boomers Official website

2020 WNBL season
WNBL seasons by team
Basketball,Melbourne Boomers
2020 in basketball
Australia,Melbourne Boomers
2020–21 in Australian basketball